Antoine Burke (born 20 July 1975) is a retired Irish athlete born in Limerick. Burke attended University College Dublin on an athletics scholarship and also studied at the University of Limerick. He had an eclectic athletic career representing Ireland as a senior athlete at the high jump, long jump, 400 metres and 400 metre hurdles. He was runner up at the 1994 World Junior Championship in the high jump and four years later jumped a personal best of 2.24 metres. Burke competed for some years both in the high jump and other events. Whilst some observers of Irish athletics mused that 6 ft 4 tall Burke who was in and around fourteen stone could have fond his ultimate forte as a decathlete, his success in this field would have been uncertain and it was a path he chose not to pursue.

As a high jumper he also finished nineteenth at the 1992 World Junior Championships, and thirteenth at the 1998 European Indoor Championships. He was a member of the Irish  Relay team who were 5th place finalists at the 2002 European Championships.

In the late 1990s he moved to Liverpool to train with renowned UK high jump coach Mike Holmes. The training group was a who's who of UK high jump talent. Antoine joined such stars as Olympic bronze medalist Steve Smith, Irish record holder Brendan Riley and multi-title holder Danny Graham.

Achievements

References

External links

http://www.gbrathletics.com/bc/aaai.htm

1975 births
Living people
Irish male high jumpers
Alumni of University College Dublin
Sportspeople from Limerick (city)